The 1871–72 season was the first season of competitive football by Queen's Park.

Overview

Queen's Park were one of 14 teams to enter the first edition of the FA Cup in 1871–72. The club would go on to reach the semi-finals without playing a match due to a combination of an inability to agree on a venue, opponents withdrawing from the competition and byes. After drawing with Wanderers at a neutral venue in London, Queen's were forced to withdraw as they could not afford to return to London for a replay.

During the club's early years, the team would play in dark blue shirts, grey shorts and black socks. The now traditional black and white hoops weren't introduced until October 1873.

Results

FA Cup

Notes

Friendly

Squad statistics

Source:

References

1871–72
Queen's Park
1871–72 in Scottish football